Teron Beal is an American singer-songwriter born in Tyler, Texas. He has also written songs for Michael Jackson, Jennifer Lopez, P!nk, Kelly Rowland, Mýa, Chrisette Michele, Robyn, Jaheim and others.

Songwriting credits
Michael Jackson – "Heaven Can Wait" (Sony, 2001)
Bonnie Raitt – "Time of Our Lives" (Capitol)
Jennifer Lopez – "Breaking Down (Wait)" (Columbia)
Mýa – "Look So Good" (Interscope)
Mýa – "After the Rain" (Interscope)
Mýa featuring Jay-Z – "Best of Me" (Interscope)
Mýa – "Fear of Flying" (Interscope)
Kelly Rowland – "Past 12" (Columbia, 2003)
Pink – "Mama Said" (Arista)
Brandy – "Blue" (Atlantic)
Deborah Cox – "Givin' It Up" (J Records)
Naughty by Nature featuring 3LW – "Feels Good" (TVT)
Boney James featuring Jaheim – "Ride" (Warner Bros.)
Jaheim featuring Nas – "Just in Case" (Warner Bros.)
Jamie Cullum – "My Yard" (Universal)
Koffee Brown – "After Party" (Arista)
Another Level – "Girlfriend" (RCA International)
Profyle – "One Night" (Motown)
Toya featuring Murphy Lee – "I Do (Part 2)" (Arista)
Olivia – "Look Around" (J Records)
Jimmy Cozier – "Playing Games" (J Records)
Changing Faces – "Cry for Me" (Atlantic)
Shanice – "Doin' My Thang" (LaFace)
Rockell – "If You Don't See" (Universal)
Immature – "Constantly" (MCA)
Jhené – "No Love" (Columbia, 2003)
Robyn – "Moonlight" (Jive)
Ideal – "She Should Be Mine" (Virgin)
Allure – "Cool with Me" (MCA)
Raine – "N-O L-O-V-E" (Arista)
Chrisette Michele – "All I Ever Think About" (Def Jam, 2009)

References

External links
Teron Beal Official website
Fanpage at Facebook
French interview with Teron Beal on Soulrnb.com (14/01/11)

Songwriters from Texas
Living people
American soul singers
1974 births
People from Tyler, Texas
21st-century American singers